Zhang Yajue (born 2000) is a Chinese sprint canoeist.

She won a medal at the 2019 ICF Canoe Sprint World Championships.

References

2000 births
Living people
Chinese female canoeists
ICF Canoe Sprint World Championships medalists in Canadian